Baret Magarian is a British-Armenian writer.

Magarian studied English literature at University College, Durham and began his career as a freelancer, writing features for The Times, The Guardian, The Observer and New Statesman. He published his first novel, The Fabrications, in 2017.

References

Living people
20th-century British male writers
21st-century British male writers
Alumni of University College, Durham
British people of Armenian descent
Year of birth missing (living people)